Răcăria is a commune in Rîșcani District, Moldova. It is composed of two villages, Răcăria and Ușurei.

References

Communes of Rîșcani District